Michael James Adams (May 5, 1930 – November 15, 1967) (Maj USAF) was an American aviator, aeronautical engineer, and USAF astronaut. He was one of twelve pilots who flew the North American X-15, an experimental spaceplane jointly operated by the Air Force and NASA.

On November 15, 1967, Adams flew X-15 Flight 191 (also known as X-15 Flight 3-65-97) aboard the X-15-3, one of three planes in the X-15 fleet. Flying to an altitude above 50 miles, Adams qualified as an astronaut according to the United States definition of the boundary of space. Moments later the craft broke apart, killing Adams and destroying the X-15-3. He was the first American space mission fatality by the American convention.

Background

Early life and military experience
Adams was born May 5, 1930, in Sacramento, California. He graduated from Sacramento Junior College. He enlisted in the United States Air Force in 1950, and earned his pilot wings and commission in 1952 at Webb Air Force Base, Texas. He served as a fighter-bomber pilot during the Korean War, where he flew 49 combat missions. This was followed by 30 months with the 613th Fighter-Bomber Squadron at England Air Force Base, Louisiana, and six months rotational duty at Chaumont Air Base in France.

Education and flight experience
In 1958, Adams received a Bachelor of Science degree in Aeronautical Engineering from the University of Oklahoma and, after 18 months of astronautics study at Massachusetts Institute of Technology, was selected in 1962 for the U.S. Air Force Test Pilot School at Edwards Air Force Base, California. Here, he won the A.B. Honts Trophy as the best scholar and pilot in his class. Adams subsequently attended the Aerospace Research Pilot School (ARPS), graduating with honors in December 1963. He was one of four Edwards aerospace research pilots to participate in a five-month series of NASA Moon landing practice tests at the Martin Company in Baltimore, Maryland. In November 1965 he was selected to be an astronaut in the United States Air Force Manned Orbiting Laboratory program. In July 1966, Major Adams came to the North American X-15 program, a joint USAF/NASA project. He made his first X-15 flight on October 6, 1966.

Death

Adams's seventh X-15 flight, Flight 3-65-97, took place on November 15, 1967. While descending, at  the aircraft encountered rapidly increasing aerodynamic pressure which impinged on the airframe, causing the X-15 to enter a violent Mach 5 spin. As the X-15 neared , it was diving at Mach 3.93 and experiencing more than 15 g vertically (positive and negative), and 8 g laterally, which inevitably exceeded the design limits of the aircraft. The aircraft broke up 10 minutes and 35 seconds after launch, killing Adams. The United States Air Force posthumously awarded him Astronaut Wings for his last flight.

An excerpt from NASA's biography page on Mike Adams discusses findings from the crash investigation:

Ground parties scoured the countryside looking for wreckage; critical to the investigation was the film from the cockpit camera. The weekend after the accident, an unofficial FRC (Fleet Readiness Centers) search party found the camera; disappointingly, the film cartridge was nowhere in sight. Engineers theorized that the film cassette, being lighter than the camera, might be further away, blown north by winds at altitude. FRC (Fleet Readiness Centers) engineer Victor Horton organized a search and on 29 November, during the first pass over the area, Willard E. Dives found the cassette. Most puzzling was Adams's complete lack of awareness of major heading deviations in spite of accurately functioning cockpit instrumentation. The accident board concluded that he had allowed the aircraft to deviate as the result of a combination of distraction, misinterpretation of his instrumentation display, and possible vertigo. The electrical disturbance early in the flight degraded the overall effectiveness of the aircraft's control system and further added to pilot workload. The MH-96 adaptive control system then caused the airplane to break up during reentry.

His remains were buried at the Mulhearn Memorial Park Cemetery, Monroe, Ouachita Parish, Louisiana.

Awards and honors
During his military career he was awarded:
 Astronaut Wings, posthumously
 Air Medal
 Air Force Commendation Medal
 Korean Service Medal
 United Nations Service Medal for Korea
 National Defense Service Medal with 1 Bronze Service Star
 Air Force Longevity Service Award with 4 clusters
 Air Force Good Conduct Medal
 A.B. Honts Trophy

Adams remembered
In 1991, Adams's name was added to the Space Mirror Memorial at the Kennedy Space Center in Florida.

On June 8, 2004, a memorial monument to Adams was erected near the crash site, northwest of Randsburg, California.

References

External links

 Michael J. Adams at nasa.gov

1930 births
1967 deaths
Accidental deaths in California
American aerospace engineers
United States Air Force personnel of the Korean War
American Korean War pilots
American test pilots
Aviators from California
Aviators killed in aviation accidents or incidents in the United States
Engineers from California
Recipients of the Air Medal
Sacramento City College alumni
Space program fatalities
20th-century American engineers
United States Air Force astronauts
United States Air Force officers
University of Oklahoma alumni
U.S. Air Force Test Pilot School alumni
Victims of aviation accidents or incidents in 1967
X-15 program
People who have flown in suborbital spaceflight
Military personnel from Sacramento, California